The javelin throw at the Summer Olympics is one of four track and field throwing events held at the multi-sport event. The men's javelin throw has been present on the Olympic athletics programme since 1908, being the last of the current throwing events to feature at the Olympics after the shot put, discus throw and hammer throw. The women's event was first contested at the 1932 Olympics, becoming the second women's throws event after the discus in 1928.

Two variants of the javelin have featured on the Olympic programme: a freestyle version was first contested at the 1906 Intercalated Games and then again the 1908 London Olympics. A one-off two-handed version was held at the 1912 Stockholm Olympics.

Medalists

Men

A YouTube video showcasing all men's javelin throw's Olympic winners can be found here.

Multiple medalists

Medalists by country

 The German total includes teams both competing as Germany and the United Team of Germany, but not East or West Germany.

Women

A YouTube video showcasing all women's javelin throw's Olympic winners can be found here.

Multiple medalists

Medalists by country

Intercalated Games
The 1906 Intercalated Games were held in Athens and at the time were officially recognised as part of the Olympic Games series, with the intention being to hold a games in Greece in two-year intervals between the internationally held Olympics. However, this plan never came to fruition and the International Olympic Committee (IOC) later decided not to recognise these games as part of the official Olympic series. Some sports historians continue to treat the results of these games as part of the Olympic canon.

A men's freestyle javelin event was contested at the 1906 Games – the first time the javelin featured on the Olympic programme. The competition was dominated by Swedish athletes, who took the first four places. Eric Lemming was a comfortable winner by a margin of over eight metres and he would go on to win the first two Olympic titles proper in 1908 and 1912. A 100 metres finalist, Knut Lindberg, was the silver medallist, while the third placer, Bruno Söderström, also won a pole vault medal that year.

Variants

1908 freestyle javelin throw
Following the freestyle javelin contest at the 1906 Intercalated Games, the event was continued at the 1908 London Olympics in spite of the addition of the standard style javelin as well. Eric Lemming won his second freestyle title, and his first officially recognised Olympics gold, and also won the standard style event as well. The freestyle event was dropped after 1908.

Two-handed javelin throw
At the 1912 Stockholm Olympics a two-handed variant of the standard javelin throw competition took place. Each athlete had three attempts using each hand and their score was calculated by adding their best performances for the left and right hands. It featured two rounds, with the top three after the first round receiving a further three attempts with each arm.

Finnish athletes completed a podium sweep as Julius Saaristo, the runner-up in the 1912 standard javelin event, took the gold medal. Eric Lemming, champion in the one-handed event, performed poorly with his left hand and finished in fourth place.

References
Participation and athlete data
Athletics Men's Javelin Throw Medalists. Sports Reference. Retrieved on 2014-04-18.
Athletics Women's Javelin Throw Medalists. Sports Reference. Retrieved on 2014-04-18.
Olympic record progressions
Mallon, Bill (2012). TRACK & FIELD ATHLETICS - OLYMPIC RECORD PROGRESSIONS. Track and Field News. Retrieved on 2014-03-12.
Specific

External links
IAAF javelin throw homepage
Official Olympics website
Olympic athletics records from Track & Field News
A video showcasing all men's javelin throw's winners
A video showcasing all women's javelin throw's winners

 
Olympics
Javelin throw